Four ships in the United States Navy have been named USS Woodbury, after the Supreme Court justice Levi Woodbury.

  was a revenue cutter, launched in 1837 and sold in 1847
  was a revenue cutter, placed into service in 1864 and decommissioned in 1915
 , was a destroyer, commissioned in 1920 and decommissioned in 1923
 , was built in 1927, served in the United States Coast Guard, until 1941 when she transferred to the Navy. She was decommissioned and sold in 1948.

See also
 

United States Navy ship names